Topa Topa is a 1938 American Western film directed by Charles Hutchison and Vin Moore and starring Joan Valerie, James Bush and LeRoy Mason. The film was originally distributed by the Poverty Row company Pennant Pictures, but was rereleased the following year by Grand National Pictures with the alternative title Children of the Wild.

Synopsis
After a dispute between two fur trappers ends in one being killed, suspicion wrongly falls on the dead man's wolfdog

Cast
 Joan Valerie as Margaret Weston 
 James Bush as Jim Turner
 LeRoy Mason as Pete Taylor
 Ruth Coleman as Laura Morton
 Jill L'Estrange as Jill Morton
 Trevor Bardette as Joe Morton
 Fred Santley as Chuck Foster
 Lyons Wickland as The Coroner
 Patsy Moran as Lydia
 Murdock MacQuarrie as Hunter 
 Silver Wolf as Fangs - the Dog
 Goldie as Goldie - the Eagle

References

Bibliography
 Pitts, Michael R. Poverty Row Studios, 1929-1940. McFarland & Company, 2005.

External links
 

1938 films
1938 adventure films
1938 Western (genre) films
American Western (genre) films
American adventure films
Films directed by Vin Moore
1930s English-language films
1930s American films